San José El Idolo is a municipality in the Suchitepéquez department of Guatemala. It contains 11,000 people.

External links
Muni in Spanish

Municipalities of the Suchitepéquez Department